American Bicycle Group (ABG) is a manufacturer of bicycles based in Chattanooga, Tennessee, United States.

The company operates under a consumer-direct business model: selling their made-to-order bikes online

and shipping them direct to the consumer.

In July 2019, ABG was honored at a White House "Made in America Product Showcase".

Technology
Best known for its cold-worked titanium bikes, the company also built the titanium legs of the Mars Land Rover Curiosity for NASA’s Jet Propulsion Laboratory in 2009.

Since 2012, ABG has used 3D printing technology for rapid prototyping and product development.

Brands

ABG owns three brands:

 Litespeed is the company's flagship line of titanium bikes.

Litespeed has received Bicycle Guide Magazine Best of Cycling Award (1988) and Eurobike Design Award.

 Quintana Roo (QR) builds triathlon bikes with a Fit-Ready service.

QR has received LAVA Magazine Gear-of-the-Year Award (2015)  and (2016)  and Interbike/TBI Innovation Award (2016).

QR also produces a line of triathlon-specific wetsuits and swimskins.

QR has been an official partner of USA Triathlon since 2013.

 Obed Bikes (formerly called Remōt and Ocoee)  specializes in carbon fiber all-road, mountain, and gravel bikes.

References

External links
 

Cycle manufacturers of the United States
Companies based in Tennessee
Mountain bike manufacturers
Vehicle manufacturing companies established in 1986
1986 establishments in Tennessee